MBN may refer to:

Radio and television networks
Maeil Broadcasting Network, cable TV network in South Korea
Mareco Broadcasting Network, radio network in the Philippines
Moody Radio (Moody Broadcasting Network), radio network in the United States aimed at a Christian audience
Mutual Black Network, radio network in the United States aimed at an African American audience

Other uses
Multi-bearer network, type of telecommunications network which can carry a data packet via one of several alternative bearers
Macaguán language (ISO 639-3: mbn), Guahiban language spoken in Colombia
Mount Barnett Airport (IATA: MBN), airport serving Mount Barnett Station, Western Australia
Zambian Airways (ICAO: MBN), former flag carrier of Zambia

See also
MBN Explorer (MesoBioNano Explorer), software package for molecular dynamics simulations, structure optimization and kinetic Monte Carlo simulations